The International Wheelchair Basketball Federation (IWBF) is the international governing body for the sport of wheelchair basketball.  IWBF is recognized by the International Paralympic Committee (IPC) as the sole competent authority in wheelchair basketball worldwide. International Basketball Federation (or FIBA) has recognized IWBF under Article 53 of its General Statutes.

History
In 1973, the International Stoke Mandeville Games Federation (ISMGF) established the first Sub-section for wheelchair basketball. At that time ISMGF was the world governing body for all wheelchair sports. In 1989, ISMGF accepted the name International Wheelchair Basketball Federation (IWBF) for its former sub-section. With this step wheelchair basketball began its journey for full independence and in 1993 IWBF was established as the world body for wheelchair basketball with full responsibility for development of the sport. Over the next five years IWBF membership grew in size and the federation configured itself into 4 geographical zones.

Members

Zones
IWBF studied several models before creating its current zone structure. Based on the number of National Organizations for Wheelchair Basketball (NOWB) with active programs at the national and international level it was decided that IWBF Americas and IWBF Europe could be the same as FIBA Americas and FIBA Europe. However, because of the limited number of countries with active programs in the rest of the world, IWBF chose to combine some regions to create better developmental and competitive opportunities within the zone. As a result, the last two zones of IWBF are IWBF Asia Oceania and IWBF Africa.

Members in May 2022:

 IWBF Americas - Americas Wheelchair Basketball Championship - 20 Members
 IWBF Europe - European Wheelchair Basketball Championship - 35 Members
 IWBF Asia Oceania - Asia Oceania Wheelchair Basketball Championships - 26 Members
 IWBF Africa - Africa Wheelchair Basketball Championship - 17 Members

National Members
As of 2021, IWBF has 95 NOWB actively participating in wheelchair basketball throughout the world with this number increasing each year. 98 in May 2022.

IWBF Asia Oceania
 Afghanistan
 Australia
 Bahrain
 Cambodia
 China
 Chinese Taipei
 Hong Kong
 Indonesia
 India
 Iran
 Iraq
 Japan
 Jordan
 Korea
 Kuwait
 Lebanon
 Malaysia
 Nepal
 New Zealand
 Oman
 Palestine
 Philippines
 Saudi Arabia
 Singapore
 Thailand
 United Arab Emirates

Africa
Algeria
Angola
Burkina Faso
Central African Republic

Egypt
Ethiopia
Gambia
Kenya
Liberia
Morocco

Namibia
Nigeria
Rwanda
South Africa
Rwanda
Tanzania
Uganda

America

There are currently 20 NOWBs in the IWBF Americas these are:
Argentina
Bolivia
Brazil
Canada
Chile
Colombia
Costa Rica

Dominican Republic
Ecuador
El Salvador
Guatemala
Honduras
Mexico
Nicaragua

Panama
Peru
Puerto Rico
Uruguay
USA
Venezuela

Euro

Armenia
Austria
Belgium
Bosnia & Herzegovina
Bulgaria
Croatia
Cyprus
Czech Republic
Denmark
Finland
France

Germany
Great Britain
Greece
Hungary
Ireland
Israel
Italy
Latvia
Lithuania
Malta
Netherlands
Norway

Poland
Portugal
Romania
Russia
Serbia
Slovak Republic
Slovenia
Spain
Sweden
Switzerland
Turkey
Ukraine

Executive Council

IWBF is governed by an Executive Council that is elected at the World Congress every four years. Philip Craven (Great Britain) who had served as Chairperson of the ISMGF wheelchair basketball Section since 1988 was elected in 1993 as the first President of IWBF.

In 2001, Brendan Hancock was elected to the position of President of the International Paralympic Committee (IPC) and retired as president of IWBF at the World Congress in 2002. Maureen Orchard (Canada) was elected as only the second president of IWBF at that same World Congress in Kitakyushu, Japan in 2002.

Classification 
In order to make the competitions fair, each player receives a point in regard their physical ability called class, from 1.0 which is the lowest class with the maximum physical disability to the 4.5 which is highest class with the lowest physical disability.

The person who performs classification called classifier. Classifiers have Bronze, Silver and Gold badges according to their knowledge and experience. Recently the classification rules made changes and have only two levels, namely the national classifier, the zone classifier and the International Classifier. 

Don Perriman (Australia) is the current President of Classification Commission

Kenneth McKay (Great Britain) 

Gold Classifier 

Gholamhossein Shahrabadi (Iran) 

Gold Classier

Toufic Allouch (Lebanon)

Wheelchair basketball national organizations around the world
Wheelchair basketball national organizations have developed in a variety of ways. Most started out the same way as IWBF, as a sub-section of a national wheelchair sport organization. As IWBF matured so did many of its member organizations and now there are several models that IWBF embraces within its membership. In Mexico the wheelchair basketball organizations are a part of their National Paralympic Committee(NPC). Australia is part of the Australian Wheelchair Athletes Ltd., and others are under the umbrella of a National Disabled Federation such as Bahrain who are part of the Bahrain Disabled Sports Federation. In the Netherlands wheelchair basketball is fully integrated into the Nederlandse Basketball Bond and in Canada the Canadian Wheelchair Basketball Association is fully independent. In all cases where a member is part of a larger federation the IWBF only recognizes the part of that federation responsible for wheelchair basketball.

Member organizations
Canadian Wheelchair Basketball Association
US - National Wheelchair Basketball Association
Australian Wheelchair Athletes Ltd.
Mexican - National National Paralympic Committee
Bahrain Disabled Sports Federation
Holland - Nederlandse Basketball Bond
Malaysia men's national wheelchair basketball team
Islamic Republic of Iran Sports Federation for the Disabled

Events
Africa Wheelchair Basketball Championship
European Wheelchair Basketball Championship
Wheelchair Basketball World Championship
IWBF U23 World Wheelchair Basketball Championship
Wheelchair Eurobasket
IWBF Champions Cup
André Vergauwen Cup
Willi Brinkmann Cup
IWBF Challenge Cup
Kitakyushu Champions Cup

References

External links
International Wheelchair Basketball Federation (IWBF)
European Wheelchair Basketball Championship-A Division  (Adana 2009/Turkey) 
Asia-Oceania Championship 2009

Sports organizations established in 1989
Basketball organizations
Federation
Paralympic Games